Nick Adams (born Nicholas Aloysius Adamshock; July 10, 1931 – February 7, 1968) was an American film and television actor and screenwriter. He was noted for his roles in several Hollywood films during the 1950s and 1960s along with his starring role in the ABC television series The Rebel (1959–1961).

Decades after his death from a prescription drug overdose at the age of 36, his widely publicized friendships with James Dean and Elvis Presley would stir speculation about both his private life and the circumstances of his death. In an AllMovie synopsis for Adams's last film, reviewer Dan Pavlides wrote, "Plagued by personal excesses, he will be remembered just as much for what he could have done in cinema as what he left behind."

Early life and career
Adams was born as Nicholas Aloysius Adamshock in Nanticoke, Pennsylvania to Catherine (Kutz) and Peter Adamshock, an anthracite coal miner. His parents were both Ukrainian. In 1958, he told columnist Hedda Hopper, "We lived in those little company houses – they were terrible. We had to buy from the company store and were always in debt and could never leave."

The family did leave when he was five years old after Adams's uncle was killed in a mining accident. "My father piled all our belongings into an old jalopy, with our bedding on top," Adams recalled. "We didn't know where we were going. He started driving, and ran out of gas and money in Jersey City, New Jersey, at Audubon Park. A man came over and started talking to us, a Mr. Cohn. He said to my father 'You look like you need a job,' and my father said 'I do.'" Adams's father was given a job as janitor of an apartment building along with living quarters in the basement. Eventually, they moved to Van Nostrand Avenue between Ocean Avenue and Rutgers Avenue. His mother worked for Western Electric in Kearny, New Jersey. 

Adams was a successful athlete at Henry Snyder High School but failed to get a part in the school play when he was a senior. While still in high school Adams was offered a playing position in minor league baseball with the St. Louis Cardinals, but he turned it down because he was uninterested in the low pay. He briefly worked as a bat boy for the Jersey City Giants, a local minor league team. Some sources recount Adams made money as a teenager by hustling games of billiards. 

In 1948, while visiting New York, 17-year-old Adams wandered into an audition for Seán O'Casey's play The Silver Tassie and met Jack Palance (who was understudying for Marlon Brando in A Streetcar Named Desire). When Palance, whose father was also a Ukrainian coal miner from Northeastern Pennsylvania, asked why he wanted to act, Adams replied, "For the money." Palance introduced him to the director of The Silver Tassie as Nick Adams. After the director declined to hire him as an extra, Palance sent Adams to a nearby junior theater group where he got his first acting job playing the role of Muff Potter in Tom Sawyer. While trying to get a role in the play Mister Roberts, Adams had a brief encounter with Henry Fonda. who advised him to get some training as an actor. 

Adams's friends teased him about his acting ambitions. "Everybody thought I was crazy," he recalled. "My father said, 'Nick, get a trade, be a barber or something.' I said, 'But, Pop, I want to do something where I can make lots of money. You can't make lots of money with just a trade.'" After a year of unpaid acting in New York, Adams hitchhiked to Los Angeles.

Hollywood career

Struggling actor

Adams was an avid reader of fan magazines and came to believe he could meet agents and directors by being seen at the Warners Theater in Beverly Hills. He got a job there as doorman, usher, and maintenance man, which included changing the notices on the theater marquee. He was fired after he put his own name up as a publicity stunt.

Adams's earliest reported paid acting job in Los Angeles was a stage role at the Las Palmas Theater in a comedy called Mr. Big Shot. Although he was paid about $60 a week, Adams had to pay $175 for membership in Actors' Equity Association. He also earned $25 one night at the Mocambo nightclub, filling in for Pearl Bailey who had fallen ill. Eight years later, Hedda Hopper told Adams she recalled writing about him at the time; and he replied by reciting back to her, "Nick Adams, gas station attendant from New Jersey, did an impersonation of Jimmy Cagney and a scene from Glass Menagerie."

After three years of struggle and optimistic self-promotion, his first film role came in 1951, an uncredited one-liner as a Western Union delivery boy in George Seaton's Somebody Loves Me (1952). This allowed him to join the Screen Actors Guild, but he was unable to find steady acting work, even when "creatively" claiming he had appeared with Palance in The Silver Tassie in New York. Undaunted, Adams joined a theater workshop run by Arthur Kennedy. In January 1952, Adams enlisted in the United States Coast Guard.

Supporting actor
About two years later, in June 1954, his ship docked in Long Beach harbor and, after a brash audition for director John Ford during which Adams did impressions of James Cagney and other celebrities while dressed in his Coast Guard uniform, he took his accumulated leave and appeared as Seaman Reber in the 1955 film version of Mister Roberts. Adams then completed his military service, returned to Los Angeles and, at the age of 23, based on his work in Mister Roberts, secured a powerful agent, and signed with Warner Bros.

Adams had a small role (as Chick) in Rebel Without a Cause (1955). Also that year Adams played the role of "Bomber" the paper boy in the widely popular film adaptation of Picnic (1955), which was mostly filmed on location in Kansas, and starred William Holden, Kim Novak, and Susan Strasberg. He was not perceived by casting directors as tall or handsome enough for leading roles, but during the late 1950s, Adams had supporting roles in several successful television productions, including one episode of Wanted Dead or Alive (1958) starring Steve McQueen, and films such as Our Miss Brooks (1956), No Time for Sergeants (1958), Teacher's Pet (1958), and Pillow Talk (1959).

James Dean
Adams initially may have met James Dean in December 1950 while jitterbugging for a soft drink commercial filmed at Griffith Park. Adams spent three years in the Coast Guard between the time this commercial was shot in late 1950 and the start of filming for Rebel Without a Cause in March 1955. Actor Jack Grinnage, who played Moose, recalled, "Off the set, Nick, Dennis (Hopper), and the others would go out together — almost like the gang we portrayed — but Jimmy and Corey Allen ... were not a part of that." They became friends during filming. During breaks, Dean and Adams entertained cast and crew with impersonations of Marlon Brando and Elia Kazan (who had directed Dean in East of Eden). A 1955 Warner Bros. press release quoted Dean as saying, "I shall be busy for the rest of 1955, and Nick will be doing film work for the next six months. Come 1956, however, I wouldn't be surprised to find myself with Adams doing a two-a-night nightclub routine — or acting in a comedy by William Shakespeare." When production was wrapped, Dean said in another press release, "I now regard Natalie (Wood), Nick, and Sal (Mineo) as co-workers; I regard them as friends ... about the only friends I have in this town. And I hope we all work together again soon." Following Dean's 1955 death in an automobile accident, Adams overdubbed some of Dean's lines for the film Giant (these are in Jett Rink's speech at the hotel) and dated co-star Natalie Wood. Adams tried to capitalize on Dean's fame through various publicity stunts, including a claim he was being stalked by a crazed female Dean fan, allowing himself to be photographed at Dean's grave in a contemplative pose, holding flowers, and surrounded by mourning, teenaged female fans along with writing articles and doing interviews about Dean for fan magazines. He also claimed to have developed Dean's affection for fast cars, later telling a reporter, "I became a highway delinquent. I was arrested nine times in one year. They put me on probation, but I kept on racing ... nowhere."

Elvis Presley
Adams's widely publicized friendship with Elvis Presley began in 1956 on the set of Presley's film Love Me Tender during the second day of shooting. Presley had admired James Dean, and when the singer arrived in Hollywood, he was encouraged by studio executives to be seen with some of the "hip" new young actors there. Meanwhile, his manager Colonel Tom Parker was worried that Elvis's new Hollywood acquaintances might influence Presley and even tell him what they were paying their managers and agents (a fraction of what Parker was being paid by Presley). Elaine Dundy called Parker a "master manipulator" who used Nick Adams and others in the entourage (including Parker's own brother-in-law Bitsy Mott) to counter possible subversion against him and control Elvis's movements. She later wrote a scathing characterization of Adams:

... Brash struggling young actor whose main scheme to further his career was to hitch his wagon to a star, the first being James Dean, about whose friendship he was noisily boastful ... this made it easy for Parker to suggest that Nick be invited to join Elvis' growing entourage of paid companions, and for Nick to accept ... following Adams' hiring, there appeared a newspaper item stating that Nick and Parker were writing a book on Elvis together.
Dundy also wrote, "Of all Elvis' new friends, Nick Adams, by background and temperament the most insecure, was also his closest." Adams was Dennis Hopper's roommate during this period, and the three reportedly socialized together, with Presley "hanging out more and more with Nick and his friends" and glad his manager "liked Nick". Decades later, Kathleen Tracy recalled Adams often met Presley backstage or at Graceland, where Elvis often asked Adams "to stay over on nights": "He and Elvis would go motorcycle riding late at night and stay up until all hours talking about the pain of celebrity" and enjoying prescription drugs.

Almost 40 years later, writer Peter Guralnick wrote that Presley found it "good running around with Nick ... there was always something happening, and the hotel suite was like a private clubhouse where you needed to know the secret password to get in and he got to change the password every day." Presley's girlfriend June Juanico complained the singer was always talking about his friend Adams and James Dean. She also was upset that Adams had started inviting himself to see Elvis, and Juanico felt that she was trying to compete for Elvis' attention. Adams would talk often about Natalie Wood to Elvis, constantly discussing her figure and her beauty, something else that caused Juanico to feel that she would soon lose Elvis to the glitz of Hollywood. Presley's own mother even commented about Adams, "He sure is a pushy little fellow".

As with Dean, Adams capitalized on his association with Presley, publishing an account of their friendship in May 1957. In August 1958, after the death of Elvis's mother Gladys, Parker wrote in a letter, "Nicky  came out to be with Elvis last Week  was so very kind of him to be there with his friend."

"The Rebel and the King" by Nick Adams is a first-person account written by Adams about his friendship with Presley. The manuscript was written in 1956 by Nick during Presley's eight days in Memphis when the singer returned home for his big Tupelo homecoming. The manuscript was discovered 45 years later by Adams's daughter and initially published in 2012.

The Rebel

In 1959 Adams starred in the ABC series The Rebel playing the character Johnny Yuma, a wandering, ex-Confederate, journal-keeping, sawed-off shotgun toting "trouble-shooter" in the old American west. He is credited as a co-creator of The Rebel, but he had no role in writing the pilot or any of the series' episodes. Adams had asked his friend Andrew J. Fenady to write the pilot as a starring vehicle for him. The series' only recurring character, publicized as a "Reconstruction beatnik", was played by Adams. He reportedly consulted with John Wayne for tips on how to play the role. Adams wanted Presley to sing the theme song for The Rebel, but the show's producer wanted Johnny Cash. Guest stars appearing on the series during its two-year run included Dan Blocker, Johnny Cash, Leonard Nimoy, Tex Ritter, and Robert Vaughn. A total of 76 half-hour episodes were filmed before the series was cancelled in 1961. Reruns were syndicated for several years. Adams went back to TV and film work, along with a role in the short-lived but critically successful television series Saints and Sinners.

Twilight of Honor
Adams was nominated for an Academy Award for Best Supporting Actor for his performance as an unlikable murder suspect in the film Twilight of Honor (1963), which featured the film debuts of both Linda Evans and Joey Heatherton. He campaigned heavily for the award, spending over $8,000 on ads in trade magazines, but many of his strongest scenes had been cut from the movie, and he lost to Melvyn Douglas.

Toho Studios and career decline
In 1964, Adams had a leading role opposite Nancy Malone in an episode ("Fun and Games") of The Outer Limits. A review of this episode written over three decades later would characterize him as an "underrated actor". By this time Adams's career was stalling. He had high hopes his co-starring performance with Robert Conrad in Young Dillinger (1964) would be critically acclaimed, but the project had low production values, and both critics and audiences rejected the film. Also that year, Adams guest-starred in an episode of the short-lived CBS drama The Reporter.

In 1965, after publicly insisting he would never work in films produced outside the U.S., Adams began accepting parts in Japanese science fiction monster movies (kaiju eiga). He landed major roles in two science fiction epics from Toho Studios in Chiyoda, Tokyo. His first Japanese movie was Frankenstein vs. Baragon, in which he played Dr. James Bowen, a radiologist working in Hiroshima who encounters a new incarnation of the Frankenstein monster. Adams next starred in the sixth Godzilla film, Invasion of Astro-Monster (known in the U.S. as Monster Zero), in which he played Astronaut Glenn, journeying to the newly discovered Planet X. In both films, his character had a love interest with characters portrayed by actress Kumi Mizuno. On the set of Monster Zero, Adams and co-star Yoshio Tsuchiya (who played the villainous Controller of Planet X) reportedly got along well and played jokes on each other. Adams made three films in Japan between 1965 and 1966. Adams' final film for Toho was the final film in the "International Secret Police" Series, which began with the film "Key of Keys" Kokusai himitsu keisatsu: Kagi no kagi (国際秘密警察 鍵の鍵, International Secret Police: Key of Keys), which was the basis for the Woody Allen scripted spoof "What's up, Tiger Lily?" (1966). The English title for this final film was "The Killing Bottle", Toho shot the film in Japanese with Adams doing his lines in English as in the previous films. An English dub was commissioned by Henry G. Saperstein, and produced by Titra Studios. This English version was never released in the U.S., but there were rumors of the English dub being released in Yugoslavia. The most interesting aspect of this film, is that Adams actually performed his own fights scenes using Kendo, a style he had been learning under Senior Grand Master Ed Parker in the States. Previous to this time, he also co-starred with Boris Karloff in Die, Monster, Die! (1965), a Gothic horror–sci fi movie filmed in England.

1967: TV episodes and low-budget films

In early 1967, Disney released Mosby's Marauders, a Civil War drama told from a southern perspective with Adams in the role of a cruel Union army sergeant. Adams guest-starred in five episodes of four TV series that year, including an installment of his friend Robert Conrad's The Wild Wild West, an appearance in Combat! and two episodes of Hondo (a short-lived western which also had an ex-Confederate theme). Throughout 1967 and early 1968, he also worked in three low-budget films. One of these was Mission Mars (1968) which has been described as "rarely seen, and utterly dreadful." Adams's costume for this movie included an off-the-shelf motorcycle helmet. Reacting to Mission Mars over 30 years later, SciFi reviewer Gary Westfahl wrote, "The only quality that Adams could persuasively project on film was a desperate desire to be popular, to be liked ... which helps to explain why Adams got his foot in many doors." Adams's last U.S. production was a movie filmed in Iowa called Fever Heat. His last film appearance was in the little-seen Spanish-language western Los Asesinos, filmed in Mexico City, Mexico.

Marriage and children

Adams married former child actress Carol Nugent in 1959. Nugent had appeared in an episode of The Rebel. They had two children, Allyson and Jeb Stuart Adams. Jeb was a child actor, then gave up acting, and is now a successful realtor in Ventura County, California. Allyson was a film director, but is now a costume designer and activist. 

Sometimes acrimonious marital problems reportedly interfered with his ability to get lucrative acting parts after 1963. While promoting Young Dillinger during a television appearance on The Les Crane Show in early 1965, Adams "shocked" the viewing audience with an announcement that he was leaving his wife, seemingly without telling her first. The couple publicly announced a reconciliation a week later, but his career and personal life following this episode have been characterized as a "tragic freefall".

Adams and actress Kumi Mizuno may have had a short affair while he was working in Japan. "That's one of the reasons my parents were divorced." his daughter, playwright Allyson Lee Adams, later said. "My dad had a penchant for becoming infatuated with his leading ladies. It was a way for him to take on the role he was playing at the time." Rumors of a romance between the two were common occurrence until Mizuno denied it during an interview in 1996.

By July 1965, Adams and Nugent were legally separated; Nugent filed for divorce in September. The following month, while Adams was in Japan, Nugent was granted a divorce and custody of the children. In January 1966, Adams and Nugent announced another reconciliation on Bill John's Hollywood Star Notebook, a local television show. However, in November 1966, Nugent resumed the divorce proceedings and obtained a restraining order against him, alleging Adams was "prone to fits of temper", and in an affidavit, charged he had "choked her, struck her and threatened to kill her during the past few weeks." On January 20, 1967, Adams was waiting for a court hearing to start when he was served with a $110,000 defamation suit by Nugent's boyfriend, Paul Rapp, who later married Nugent. Nevertheless, nine days later he was granted temporary custody of the children. His son Jeb Adams later recalled, "He saw it as a competition, basically, more than anything of getting custody of us. But, a matter of a week or two later, he gave us back to my mom." Nugent later regained legal custody of the children.

Death

After finishing Los Asesinos (1968), produced by Luis Enrique Vergara and filmed in Mexico, Adams bought a plane ticket with his own money and flew to Rome, Italy, to co-star with Aldo Ray in a science fiction/horror movie called Murder in the Third Dimension, but when he got there, he found the project had been dropped. Susan Strasberg, who had worked with him 13 years earlier on the hit film Picnic and was living in Italy, encountered a thoroughly demoralized Adams in a Rome bar.

On the night of February 7, 1968, his lawyer and friend, ex-LAPD officer Ervin Roeder, drove to the actor's house at 2126 El Roble Lane in Beverly Hills to check on him after a missed dinner appointment. Seeing a light on and his car in the garage, Roeder broke through a window and discovered Adams in his upstairs bedroom, slumped dead against a wall.

During the autopsy Dr. Thomas Noguchi found enough paraldehyde, sedatives and other drugs in the body "to cause instant unconsciousness." The death certificate lists "paraldehyde and promazine intoxication" as the immediate cause of death, along with the notation "accident; suicide; undetermined." During the 1960s, drug interaction warnings were not so prominent as they later would be, and the American Medical Association has subsequently warned these two types of drugs should never be taken together.

The death of Nick Adams has been cited in articles and books about Hollywood's unsolved mysteries along with speculation by a few of his acquaintances that he was murdered (according to author David Kulczyk, Adams was apparently planning to write a tell-all book revealing many sexual secrets of Hollywood names) and claims no trace of paraldehyde (a liquid sedative often given to alcoholics at the time and one of two drugs attributed to his death) was ever found in his home. However, Adams's brother Andrew had become a medical doctor and prescribed the sedative to him. Moreover, a story in the Los Angeles Times reported stoppered bottles with prescription labels were found in the medicine cabinet near the upstairs bedroom where Adams's body was discovered. Through the years, his children offered speculation ranging from murder to accidental death, the latter perhaps caused by Roeder while trying to calm the actor's nerves with an unintentionally lethal combination of alcohol and prescription drugs (although the autopsy found no alcohol in Adams's blood). Actor Robert Conrad, Adams's best friend, consistently maintained that the death was accidental.

Carol Adams is listed as Adams's spouse on his death certificate, evidence the divorce had not become final when the actor died. She and the children were living only a few blocks from his recently-rented house on El Roble Lane.

Adams's remains were interred at Saints Cyril and Methodius Ukrainian Catholic Cemetery in Berwick, Pennsylvania. The backside of his gravestone, which bears a silhouette of Adams wearing the Civil War-era cap from his television series, is inscribed Nick Adams — The Rebel — Actor of Hollywood Screens.

Later published speculation

Sexuality
Decades later, Adams's highly publicized life and death at a young age, his friendships with cultural icons such as James Dean and Elvis Presley, and his reported drug consumption made his private life the subject of many reports and assertions by some writers who have claimed Adams may have been gay or bisexual. One of the earliest published mentions on this overall topic was made by gossip columnist Rona Barrett in her 1974 autobiography, in which she made no assertion Adams was homosexual or bisexual but claimed Adams had told her, along with a "whole roomful of people," that he wasn't making it because no one in Hollywood's upper stratosphere would accept his wife. Barrett called it "untrue. She was one of the most refreshing wives in the entire community" and went on to say Adams "had become the companion to a group of salacious homosexuals" who flattered the actor, which affected his judgment and caused him to blame Carol. Hollywood biographer Lawrence J. Quirk claimed Mike Connolly (a gay gossip columnist for The Hollywood Reporter from 1951 to 1966) "would put the make on the most prominent young actors, including Robert Francis, Guy Madison, Anthony Perkins, Nick Adams, and James Dean." According to American Film (1986), "Nick Adams, who was ...gay, was the butt of anti-gay humor in Pillow Talk".

Some writers later called Adams a "Hollywood hustler" or a "street hustler". One journalist also refers to Adams as a "pool hustler" who made money in pool halls when he was a teenager in New Jersey and later while struggling to make ends meet during his early years in Hollywood.

Friendship with Dean and Presley
It is uncertain whether James Dean and Adams met before his service in the United States Coast Guard (1952–1955) and subsequent role in Rebel Without a Cause (1955). In his 1986 gossip book about gay Hollywood, Conversations with My Elders, Boze Hadleigh claimed actor Sal Mineo told him in 1972, "I didn't hear it from Jimmy (James Dean), who was sort of awesome to me when we did Rebel, but Nick told me they had a big affair." According to Presley biographer Albert Goldman, "Nick Adams ingratiated himself with James Dean precisely as he would do a year or so later with Elvis. He offered himself to the shy, emotionally contorted and rebellious Dean, as a friend, a guide, a boon companion, a homosexual lover – whatever role or service Dean required." Journalist, screenwriter and author of books about Hollywood, John Gregory Dunne wrote that "James Dean was bisexual, as were Nick Adams and Sal Mineo." According to Eric Braun, "Elvis was attracted by Adams' outgoing personality and the young actors caused quite a stir, cruising round Los Angeles with Natalie Wood, Russ Tamblyn and others on their Hondas." In 2005, Byron Raphael and Presley biographer Alanna Nash wrote that Adams may have "swung both ways" like "Adams's good pal (and Elvis's idol) James Dean. Tongues wagged that Elvis and Adams were getting it on."

Studio-arranged dates
Adams regularly dated actresses with whom he made movies. During the mid-1950s, photographs of him with actress Natalie Wood were widely publicized in fan magazines. Modern Screen wrote at the time "their relationship has been mostly for fun" and they shared "a tendency toward moodiness and unpredictability." The magazine also reported they had given joint interviews "in which they admitted they adored each other" and "they even came terribly close to getting married" in Las Vegas. The same article also remarked that on one of their trips they "posed for innumerable publicity photographs — that was the real reason for the trip — " and "Right now, both Nick and Natalie are inclined to deny the whole Las Vegas episode." In his 2004 biography Natalie Wood: A Life biographer and screenwriter Gavin Lambert wrote in passing, Wood's "first studio-arranged date with a gay or bisexual actor had been with Nick Adams." In his biography of gay Hollywood agent Henry Willson, Robert Hofler deals with the rise of the studio star system, in which several actors spent time on the homosexual casting couch and dated girls or even entered into sham marriages in order to cover their homosexuality. "In the Henry Willson date pool," the author says, "Nick Adams was one client, among many, who glommed on to Natalie Wood to get his picture taken." Suzanne Finstad cites actor Jack Grinnage, one of the gang members in Rebel Without a Cause, about Nick Adams's and Dennis Hopper's reasons "for getting close to Natalie. 'I remember being in Dennis' dressing room with Nick and Natalie ... I don't know which one of them said this — it was Nick or Dennis — but he said, "We're gonna hang on to her bra straps." Meaning up the career ladder.' Natalie's tutor, who knew Hopper and Adams off set, said, 'Both of those two guys were all over her ... because they could see that this movie was going to be a big thing for Natalie ... they were game for anything in order to be noticed and to get ahead in the business.' "

Actress Olive Sturgess relates: "When Nick and I went out, it was a casual thing —no great love or anything like that ... I thought he was very troubled ... You could feel he was troubled. It was the manner he had —that was the way he was in real life, always brooding ... When we went out, it was never on his motorcycle! That's one trick he couldn't pull on me. We always went in a car!"

Lack of confirmation
Because of morality clauses in studio contracts, along with practical marketing concerns, most homosexual actors during the 1950s and 1960s were forced to be discreet about their sexuality. However, Adams was known in Hollywood for embellishing and inventing stories about his show business experiences and long tried to capitalize on his associations with James Dean and Elvis Presley. In a brief biographical article, journalist Bill Kelly wrote Adams "became James Dean's closest pal, although Nick was straight and Dean was bisexual." Moreover, there are neither court documents (such as from the long and drawn-out divorce and child custody proceedings between him and his wife), nor personal letters from Adams, nor directly attributable statements by any alleged male lovers, to support the assertions.

Filmography

Notes and references

External links

Peter L. Winkler, "Nick Adams: His Hollywood Life and Death", Crime Magazine, August 15, 2003. 

1931 births
1968 deaths
20th-century American male actors
20th-century American male writers
20th-century American screenwriters
American male film actors
American male screenwriters
American male television actors
American male television writers
American people of Ukrainian descent
American television writers
Burials in Pennsylvania
Drug-related deaths in California
Henry Snyder High School alumni
Male actors from Los Angeles
Male actors from New Jersey
Male actors from Pennsylvania
Military personnel from Pennsylvania
People from Jersey City, New Jersey
People from Nanticoke, Pennsylvania
RCA Victor artists
Screenwriters from California
Screenwriters from Pennsylvania
United States Coast Guard enlisted
Western (genre) television actors